Stirling Terrace may refer to:
Stirling Terrace, Albany, Western Australia
Stirling Terrace, Toodyay, Western Australia